Mohammed Salisu Abdul Karim (born 17 April 1999) is a Ghanaian professional footballer who plays as a centre-back for Premier League club Southampton and the Ghana national team.

Salisu started his senior career with Valladolid, featuring for the reserve side before making his first team debut in 2019. He made 34 appearances for the club before joining Southampton for a £10.9 million fee in 2020.

Club career

Early career
Born in Kumasi, Salisu started his career at his local youth club Kumasi Barcelona Babies before joining West African Football Academy in 2013. He left the latter for personal reasons in 2015, and then remained over a year without a club before impressing on a trial at the newly formed Nsawam branch of the African Talent Football Academy in March 2017. In October 2017, he joined Real Valladolid's youth setup.

Valladolid

2017–18 season
Salisu made his senior debut with the reserves on 28 January 2018, starting in a 4–2 Segunda División B home loss against Coruxo. On 1 March, he extended his contract until 2021. He scored his first senior goal on 29 April, netting the equaliser in the 82nd minute of a 2–2 away draw against Racing Ferrol.

2018–19 season
On 16 July 2018, Salisu was promoted to the senior Valladolid squad. He made his professional debut on 9 January 2019, starting in a 1–0 away loss against Getafe in that season's Copa del Rey. On 22 May 2019, Salisu extended his contract to keep him at the club until 2022.

2019–20 season
He made his La Liga debut on 18 August, starting in a 2–1 away victory over Real Betis. After the departure of Fernando Calero to Espanyol, Salisu became a starter for the Castile and León side, partnering Kiko Olivas. On 26 October 2019, he scored his first professional goal by netting the second goal of a 2–0 home win against Eibar.

Southampton

2020–21 season
On 12 August 2020, Salisu joined Premier League club Southampton for a fee worth £10.9 million. The English club had triggered a buyout clause in the defender's contract with Salisu putting pen to paper on a four-year deal. Manager Ralph Hasenhüttl hailed his new signing, saying he was a future prospect who had all the qualities to come to the Premier League and help Southampton.

Salisu had yet to feature for Southampton three months after he had signed with Hasenhüttl providing an update in November 2020, stating:''There is still a way to go I think for being match fit, but I am very happy he's here. He's a long-term project and I am sure that he will play a lot of games for us.'' Salisu made his Southampton debut on 11 February 2021, six months after signing for the club, playing the full 90 minutes and keeping a clean sheet in a 2–0 FA Cup away victory over Wolverhampton Wanderers as Danny Ings and Stuart Armstrong scored a goal each to send Southampton through to the quarter-finals of the competition.

He made his Premier League debut three days later when he came on in the 72nd minute to replace the injured Kyle Walker-Peters, also against Wolverhampton Wanderers ending with a 2–1 loss at home. Salisu made his first Premier League start the following week in a 1–1 draw with Chelsea, putting in an impressive performance.

2021–22 season 
On 21 September 2021, Salisu scored his first professional goal for Southampton against Sheffield United in the EFL Cup which ended 2–2 at full time before Southampton advanced 4–2 on penalties. On 28 December 2021, Salisu gave away a penalty and got a red card after receiving his second booking for a foul on Son Heung-Min, with the game against Tottenham ending in a 1–1 draw.

International career 
In November 2019, Salisu received his first call-up to Ghana's senior squad, after being named by Kwesi Appiah in the squad for the 2021 African Cup of Nations qualifiers against South Africa and São Tomé and Príncipe. He withdrew from the squad citing injury problems. In 2020, after C.K. Akonnor was appointed as manager of the national team, according to media speculation he made attempts to reach him but his efforts proved futile as seemed Salisu was not interested in playing for the team. His family later came out with a statement to refute all the information within the public space that suggested his refusal to play for the national team. The statement read that '' We further wish to state unequivocally that our son is a proud Ghanaian and very ready to represent Ghana at every level and time''. His elder brother later granted an interview on local radio station Angel FM talking about his brother's call up snub into the Black Starlets, the Ghana U-17 team whilst he was playing in Ghana, due his inability to pay to be in the team and not because his performance was substandard.

In April 2021, during an interview with MozzartSport Kenya, Salisu stated that he would be proud to play for the national team, but also that he felt like it was not the right time for him to play, as he wanted to focus on his club career, instead. In July 2022, the president of the Ghana FA, Kurt Okraku, officially announced that Salisu had finally agreed to represent the Black Stars.

Salisu made his debut for Ghana on 23 September 2022, as a second-half substitute in a 3–0 friendly defeat against Brazil. On 17 November 2022, Salisu scored his first goal in a friendly against Switzerland, which Ghana won 2–0.

Career statistics

Club

International

As of match played 28 November 2022. Ghana score listed first, score column indicates score after each Salisu goal.

References

External links
 
 
Mohammed Salisu at Premier League

1999 births
Living people
Footballers from Kumasi
Ghanaian footballers
Ghana international footballers
Association football defenders
La Liga players
Segunda División B players
Real Valladolid Promesas players
Real Valladolid players
Southampton F.C. players
2022 FIFA World Cup players
Ghanaian expatriate footballers
Ghanaian expatriate sportspeople in Spain
Expatriate footballers in Spain
Premier League players
Ghanaian expatriate sportspeople in England
Expatriate footballers in England